Rita Nwadike  (born 3 November 1974) is a Nigerian former football midfielder who played for the Nigeria women's national football team at the 2004 Summer Olympics.  At the club level, she played for Rivers Angels. She scored Nigeria's first ever FIFA Women's World Cup goal against Canada in the 1995 tournament in Sweden.

See also
 Nigeria at the 2004 Summer Olympics

References

External links
 
 

1974 births
Living people
Nigerian women's footballers
Place of birth missing (living people)
Footballers at the 2000 Summer Olympics
Footballers at the 2004 Summer Olympics
Olympic footballers of Nigeria
Women's association football midfielders
1991 FIFA Women's World Cup players
Nigeria women's international footballers
1995 FIFA Women's World Cup players
1999 FIFA Women's World Cup players
Rivers Angels F.C. players
Igbo people